Marcelo Javier Zuleta (born 25 January 1964) is a former Argentine football player and manager.

Managerial career
He was lastly the coach of  Club Deportivo El Nacional  in the Serie A
.

External links
 Marcelo Javier Zuleta at zerozero

1964 births
Living people
Argentine football managers
Argentine expatriate football managers
Expatriate football managers in El Salvador
Expatriate football managers in Haiti
Expatriate football managers in Nicaragua
Expatriate football managers in Greece
Expatriate football managers in Albania
Expatriate football managers in Saudi Arabia
Expatriate football managers in Bosnia and Herzegovina
Expatriate football managers in Vietnam
Expatriate football managers in Bolivia
Najran SC managers
Nicaragua national football team managers
Kategoria Superiore managers
Saudi Professional League managers
Argentine expatriate sportspeople in Saudi Arabia